Gyrodactylus is a genus of parasitic flatworms in the family Gyrodactylidae.

Species
Species listed in the World Register of Marine Species:

Other species:
 Gyrodactylus benedeni
 Gyrodactylus bios
 Gyrodactylus dorlodoti
 Gyrodactylus elegans von Nordmann, 1832
 Gyrodactylus turnbulli

References

 
Monogenea genera